France has a rich selection of Gold and Silver commemorative coins.  These coins are minted by Monnaie de Paris, which is a state owned industrial and commercial company.

Cupro-nickel-alu

€0.25

Gold

€10

€20

€50

Silver

€1.50

€5

€20

Notes

References

 

France
Coins of France
2005 in France